Twisting My Melon: The Autobiography is a 2011 autobiography by Shaun Ryder, about his time fronting British rock bands Happy Mondays and Black Grape. The book received mainly positive reviews from music publications, several of which considered it an entertaining read.

Background and writing
In the 1980s and 1990s, Shaun Ryder served as the frontman for British rock band Happy Mondays, releasing four albums with them, and then two more with his other band Black Grape. Journalist John Warburton, who had ghostwritten a sports column with Ryder, went on to write a book about Happy Mondays' first reunion in the late 1990s, and co-credited it to Ryder. He said he "didn't really have anything to do with it at all," explaining that Warburton had approached him to write a biography. Ryder said he was not interested in the idea at the time, but allowed him to accompany the band on tour and document the proceedings. For his autobiography, Ryder said he did research by combing through back issues of publications, such as Melody Maker and NME, combined with his "pals [telling] me stories I vaguely remember". He also visited pubs and clubs he used to frequent, coming across junkies he met 20 years prior.

Content and publication
Twisting My Melon: The Autobiography is named after a catchphrase Ryder exclaimed during the opening moments of "Step On". The phrase itself stemming from Steve McQueen. The book details his early upbringing in Salford, dropping out of education to become a postman and discovering drugs in the process. He discussed forming Happy Mondays in 1980, their period on Factory Records and success with their third studio album Pills 'n' Thrills and Bellyaches (1990). Ryder admitted that this period was a "bit of a blur. I can actually remember the Sixties better than the Eighties," attributing this to having a thyroid condition. He referred to himself during this time as a caricature, akin to Alice Cooper.

Continuing with his time in Black Grape, Ryder covers a dispute with his former management team of William and Gloria Nicholl, which saw any earnings he made were used to pay off debt. He said this dispute postponed his career for a decade. Following this, Ryder would appear on reality TV shows such as Ghosthunting With... and I'm a Celebrity...Get Me Out of Here!. When asked what he learned about himself through making the book, he mentioned how drugs took a toll on his psyche: "Deaths of family members and friends that didn't even touch you. Drugs cut you off emotionally". It was first printed as a hardback edition on 15 September 2011 by Bantam Press; it was promoted with a launch event at the Waterstones in Manchester. A paperback iteration followed in August 2012 by Corgi Books, an imprint of Transworld Publishers.

Reception and film adaptation
PRS for Music's Anita Awbi wrote that the book "provides wonderful insight into both Ryder's personal life, and the making of one of Manchester's most legendary bands". She said that the successful years of Happy Mondays are recounted "with humour and realism in equal measure, philosophically balancing the ups and downs to create an honest and compelling narrative". Steve Jelbert of The Independent said "few will read this highly entertaining, effortlessly egotistical tome for moral elevation". What's On North writer Margaret Chrystall gave it similar praise, stating that for "anyone interested in the tale of a proper maverick, shamen-like songwriter and performer – there’s plenty of unique memories packed into this must-read that should top the rock books of 2011 list".

Dorian Lynskey of The Guardian included the book on his list of the best books of 2011, though mentioned that Ryder's "memory is riddled with drug-induced potholes".  The Times columnist Camilla Long was impressed by the "clarity of [Ryder's] recollection" to some of the events, though highlighted an occasion where he went to Brazil with Piers Morgan, which she called a "story that has elements of total fabrication". In a review for The Observer, journalist Kitty Empire said noted that while there were "countless accounts of [the Madchester] period already out there; what distinguishes Ryder's is the fact that it's finally coming out of the horse's mouth". Empire was dismayed at the lack of Ryder's "love for music", adding that the reader is given only "fleeting glimpses of the surreal poetics that made Ryder the dissolute bard of baggy".

In April 2013, Ryder said ITV were looking to make a movie adaptation of his autobiography. He mentioned that Danny Brocklehurst was drafted in to do the screenplay. By November 2013, the idea was switched to a TV show and was formally announced by ITV. In September 2019, NME reported that it went back to being a film, being directed by Matt Greenhalgh. It would star Jack O'Connell as Ryder, with production planned for early 2020.

See also
 Happy Mondays – Excess All Areas: A Biography
 Telling Stories – autobiography by Tim Burgess about contemporaries the Charlatans

References
Citations

Sources

External links 
 
 [ Twisting My Melon: The Autobiography] at Google Books

British autobiographies
Music autobiographies
2011 non-fiction books
Books about Happy Mondays
Bantam Press books